This is a list of the main career statistics of professional American tennis player Serena Williams.

Performance timelines

Singles 

Current through the 2022 WTA Tour.

Doubles

Mixed doubles

Grand Slam finals

Singles: 33 (23 titles, 10 runner-ups) 

Williams has won an Open Era record 23 Grand Slam singles titles. To win those titles, she has beaten 12 different players who have been ranked No. 1, including her sister, Venus Williams, seven times. She is also one of only two players in the Open Era to have won each major three or more times.

Women's doubles: 14 (14 titles) 

Serena and Venus are the only doubles team to win their first 14 Grand Slam doubles finals and have never lost a Grand Slam doubles final.

Mixed doubles: 4 (2 titles, 2 runner-ups)

Other significant finals

Olympic finals

Singles: 1 (1 gold medal)

Doubles: 3 (3 gold medals)

Year-end championships finals

Singles: 7 (5 titles, 2 runner-ups)

Tier I / Premier Mandatory & Premier 5 finals

Singles: 33 finals (23 titles, 10 runner-ups)

Doubles: 2 finals (2 titles)

WTA career finals

Singles: 98 (73 titles, 25 runner-ups)

Doubles: 25 (23 titles, 2 runner-up)

Team competition: 4 (3 titles, 1 runner-up)

Fed Cup participation 

Current through the 2020 Fed Cup Qualifying Round.

Singles (14–1)

Doubles (3–2)

Record against other players

Record against top 10 players 

Williams's record against players who have been ranked in the top 10. She has recorded wins against 22 of the other 26 women who have been ranked No. 1 in the Open Era, with the other 4 players retiring before her professional career began in 1995.

Active players are in boldface.

Record against No. 11–20 players 

Williams's record against players who have been ranked world No. 11–20.

  Anastasia Pavlyuchenkova 6–0
  Zheng Jie 6–0
  Tamarine Tanasugarn 6–0
  Eleni Daniilidou 5–0
  Nathalie Dechy 5–0
  Kaia Kanepi 5–0
  Shahar Pe'er 5–0
  Elena Vesnina 5–0
  Daria Gavrilova 4–0
  María José Martínez Sánchez 4–0
  Barbora Strýcová 4–0
  Klára Koukalová 4–1
  Elena Likhovtseva 4–1
  Magüi Serna 4–1
  Alizé Cornet 4–3
  Dája Bedáňová 3–0
  Alona Bondarenko 3–0
  Amy Frazier 3–0
  Varvara Lepchenko 3–0
  Mirjana Lučić-Baroni 3–0
  Peng Shuai 3–0
  Sabine Lisicki 3–1
  Katarina Srebotnik 3–1
  Sabine Appelmans 2–0
  Elena Bovina 2–0
  Tatiana Golovin 2–0
  Anabel Medina Garrigues 2–0
  Tatiana Panova 2–0
  Lisa Raymond 2–0
  Aravane Rezaï 2–0
  Magdaléna Rybáriková 2–0
  Anna Smashnova 2–0
  Karolina Šprem 2–0
  Iroda Tulyaganova 2–0
  Meghann Shaughnessy 2–1
  Ekaterina Alexandrova 1–0
  Ruxandra Dragomir 1–0
  Kirsten Flipkens 1–0
  Inés Gorrochategui 1–0
  Anne Kremer 1–0
  Magda Linette 1–0
  Petra Martić 1–0
  Elise Mertens 1–0
  Karolína Muchová 1–0
  Larisa Neiland 1–0
  Alison Riske-Amritraj 1–0
  Naoko Sawamatsu 1–0
  Alexandra Stevenson 1–0
  Silvija Talaja 1–0
  Silvia Farina Elia 1–1
  Kimberly Po 1–1
  Wang Qiang 1–1
  Anastasija Sevastova 1–1
  Virginie Razzano 0–1
  Sybille Bammer 0–2

 * Statistics correct .

Wins over top ranked players

No. 1 wins

Top 10 wins 

Williams has a  record against players who were, at the time the match was played, ranked in the top 10.

WTA Tour career earnings 

* As of September 12, 2022

Longest winning streaks

33-win major streak 2002–03

34-win streak 2013

33-win major streak 2014–15

Double bagel matches (6–0, 6–0)

Grand Slam tournament seedings 

Boldface indicates tournaments won by Williams, while italics indicates she was the runner-up.

Statistics
Tennis career statistics